Korni Grupa (trans. Korni Group) was a Yugoslav rock band formed in Belgrade in 1968. Korni Grupa, also known as the Kornelyans, the name which they used during a short-lived foray into the international market, was one of the first Yugoslav rock bands to achieve major mainstream popularity, and often considered the first Yugoslav supergroup. Korni Grupa is considered to be one of the most prominent and influential bands in the history of rock music in Yugoslavia.

Since the beginning of their career, the band had developed a two-way musical development, one of commercial pop rock music aimed for mainstream popularity, and the other, an artistically influenced progressive rock sound crossed with influences of psychedelic, folk, jazz and symphonic rock music. The band was led by keyboard player Kornelije Kovač, who formed the band with the bassist Bojan Hreljac, drummer Vladimir Furduj and guitarist Velibor Kacl. After changing several vocalists, Miroslava Kojadinović, Dušan Prelević and Dalibor Brun, and releasing several singles, the band's vocalist became Dado Topić who brought along his former bandmate Josip Boček as the replacement for Kacl. The lineup recorded an album's worth material, released posthumously as 1941., before Topić's departure. His substitute was Zdravko Čolić, who after a six-month period left the spot to Zlatko Pejaković.

With Pejaković the band recorded their eponymous debut album, which was the first full-length rock album in SR Serbia and fourth in Yugoslavia, and an English language second album Not an Ordinary Life, under the name Kornelyans. The band had also performed at the 1974 Eurovision Song Contest reaching the 12th place, owing to which, along with the little success of the second album, the band had decided to split. They held two farewell concerts at the Novi Sad Studio M and disbanded on December 1, 1974. A part of the recordings from the concerts was released on the posthumous compilation album Mrtvo more, the first double album in the history of Yugoslav rock music. After the band disbandment, the band members pursued careers as solo acts, studio musicians and producers and reunited in 1987 with Topić on vocals for two performances, in Zagreb and Belgrade.

History

Early years (1968–1969) 
Having left the Sarajevo band Indexi in 1968, keyboardist Kornelije "Bata" Kovač moved to Belgrade, and after meeting bass guitarist Bojan Hreljac, former member of recently disbanded Elipse, the two decided to form a new band, inviting drummer Vladimir "Furda" Furduj, Hreljac's former bandmate from Elipse, and guitarist Velibor "Borko" Kacl from the also recently disbanded Zlatni Dečaci. Korni Grupa completed its lineup with the arrival of the female singer Miroslava "Seka" Kojadinović in September 1968, with the event receiving a significant media coverage due to the members being well known musicians owing to their previous work, the band becoming the first Yugoslav supergroup. The band had its first live appearance at the Belgrade Trade Union Hall during the Sportsman of the Year award ceremony. The performance featured two go-go dancers appearing on stage with the band, which performed several songs they have written during the rehearsals at Hreljac's garage and a cover version of the song "If You Go Away" in which the band had used the sounds of the sea played on a tape recorder placed inside the piano. The performance provided the band with the public's attention and opportunities to perform live at numerous venues in Belgrade.

One of such performances was at Belgrade Youth Center, where they held a conceptual multimedia performance, with painter Raša Trkulja painting during the performance, ballerinas closed in multicolored plastic cylinders which would blur their silhouettes during their dancing, and actors performing sketches such as dusting the piano or the Lady With the Dog sketch in which a lady would walk a man on a leash in the first part of the performance and the man walking the lady in the second part. The band was also invited to perform in the Radio Belgrade show Studio VI vam pruža šansu (Studio VI Gives You a Chance), however, Kojadinović refused to sing, so for the band's appearance in the show Kovač provided the lead vocals. The reason for her refusal was the selection of the songs for the performance, including the song "Marijan", the first song the Kovač had written with the band, which she disliked due to being heavily influenced by the 1960s underground music, especially Julie Driscoll, whose version of "Season of the Witch" the band used to perform at the time. Since the rest of the band took Kovač's side, Kojadinović was excluded from the band, after which she started a short solo career, releasing several 7" singles before retiring from music and becoming a lawyer.

Dušan "Prele" Prelević, famous around Belgrade at the time for his distinguished rhythm and blues and soul vocal style and excessive lifestyle, became the new Korni Grupa vocalist. At the time, Kovač was influenced by the emerging progressive rock musical style, but due to the hostility of the audience and media towards the music, he wrote the pop-oriented song "Cigu-ligu" ("Tweedle-dum, Tweedle-dee") which Korni Grupa performed at the 1968 Jugovizija festival in Zagreb, the competition for the Yugoslav representative on the Eurovision song contest. Prelević arrived drunk to the performance, leading to an argument with Kovač that ended in the decision that he should leave the band. Nevertheless, in 1969, the band released their debut single "Cigu-ligu", with "Čovek i pas" ("A Man and a Dog") as the B-side, with Prelević on vocals, the latter of which Prelević rerecorded on his solo album Ja, Prele (I, Prele), released in 1996. Having left Korni Grupa, Prelević appeared in the cult 1969 Yugoslav adaptation of the Hair musical in Atelje 212 theatre, recorded a studio album with progressive rock band Opus, a single with keyboardist Oliver Mandić, as well as several solo albums and devoted to a literary and journalism career. 

The new Korni Grupa singer became Dalibor Brun from Rijeka, a former Uragani and Bohemi (Bohemians) member, with whom Korni Grupa recorded their first hits "Magična ruka" ("The Magic Hand"), "Sonata" and "Dzum-ram". With Brun, himself fostering a typically festival singer image and a rock vocal style, the band succeeded in maintaining a double track career – alternating between being a festival band performing commercial pop rock songs on one hand and a progressive rock band following the current global rock musical trends on the other. With the folk influenced song "Pastir i cvet" ("A Shepperd and a Flower"), the band appeared at the Singing Europe festival in Netherlands winning the award for the most original band, despite being in competition with acts such as the Wallace Collection and Olivia Newton-John. The song, released as a single during 1969 by PGP-RTB, with "Ako budeš sama" ("If You Were Alone") as the B-side, featured Balkan folk instruments šargija, tarabuk and frula. This was however, the last recording with Brun as he, becoming less enthusiastic about the band's work, decided to leave the band conventionally. Having left Korni Grupa, Brun started a successful career as a pop singer.

Dado Topić years (1969–1971) 
After Brun's departure, owing to the mutual friendship with dancer Lokica Stefanović, the new Korni Grupa vocalist became Dado Topić, a former member of the Osijek band Dinamiti. with Topić the band appeared at the Opatija festival, performing the song "Devojčice mala" ("Little Girl"), which was released on a split single with the song "Priča se" ("The Rumor Says") by the quartet 4M. With Topić, the band held their first solo concert in Belgrade on November 6, 1969 in Belgrade Youth Center. The concert was entitled "Uz malu pomoć naših frendova" ("With A Little Help from Our Friends"). Soon after, Kacl left the band and decided to retire from music. He died in a car accident in May 1984. He was replaced by Josip Boček, Topić's former bandmate from Dinamiti who at the time was playing in his own band Boček i Tri (Boček and Three). The new lineup started working on their own vision of progressive music, recording the songs "Jedna žena" ("A Woman"), "Prvo svetlo u kući broj 4" ("The First Light in the House Number 4"), co written by Topić and Kovač, classical music-inspired "Etida" ("Étude") and "Žena je luka a čovek brod" ("Woman is a Harbor and Man is a Ship").

With the performance of "Jedna žena" at the 1970 Zagreb Music Festival Korni Grupa won both the audience and jury award for best song. The band continued recording commercial material with the recording of the song "Bube" ("Beetles"), the theme song for the Miša Radivojević movie Bube u glavi (Beetles in the Head), released on single with "Neko spava pored mene" ("Somebody is Sleeping Beside Me") as the B-side, as well as the highly successful "Trla baba lan" ("Granny Scutched the Flax"), "Slika" ("Image"), co-written with the at the time little known author Ljuba Ninković, continuing their double musical career. In 1971, Korni Grupa recorded the musical poem "1941." on the lyrics of Branko Ćopić with Josipa Lisac as a guest vocalist. The material was recorded as a soundtrack for the 1941. television series, for which Momo Kapor did the mise-en-scène, directed by Jovan Ristić. Afterward, the band spent a month in Paris, playing at the fashion show which presented "Prokleta Jerina" ("Damned Jerina") line of clothing by fashion designer Aleksandar Joksimović. At the show, the band had met the producer Alan Milo from the Barclay record label. However, guided by his own ambitions, Topić left the band to form Time, a progressive rock and jazz fusion group that would also go on to nationwide popularity, before becoming a successful solo act.

Topić was replaced by the former Ambasadori vocalist Zdravko Čolić in September 1971. A young singer with more of a festival schlager sensibility, twenty-year-old Čolić right away presented an uneasy fit with the band's well-established propensity for musical experimentation with even his stage movements and vocal style not fitting into the progressive aspect of the band's musical expression. Čolić thus remained in the band for only six months, recording three songs — "Gospa Mica gazdarica" ("Lady Mica the Landlord"), "Kukavica" ("The Cuckoo") and "Pogledaj u nebo" ("Look at the Sky") — before leaving to start a solo career that would by late 1970s see him become one of the most popular and commercial acts in SFR Yugoslavia. During Čolić's short stay, Korni Grupa shot a television special directed by Jovan Ristić, featuring songs from the band's commercial repertoire.

Zlatko Pejaković years (1972–1974) 
In early 1972, a former Lavine (Avalanches), Zlatni Akordi and Had (Hades) member Zlatko Pejaković became the band's new singer, and with Pejaković, Korni Grupa recorded their first full-length album, Korni Grupa. At the time of the album release, Korni Grupa was one of four former Yugoslav rock bands with a full-length album (Grupa 220, Žeteoci and Time being the other three), as the scene revolved mostly around 7-inch singles. The album featured complex songs "Put na Istok" ("A Trip to the East"), "Bezglave Ja Ha horde" ("The Headless Ya Ha Hordes"), "Moj bol" ("My Pain"), "Glas sa obale boja" ("A Voice from the Coast of Colors"). Following the album release, the band appeared at the Zagreb Music Festival and won the second place with the performance of the song "Kosovka devojka" ("Kosovo Maiden"), as well as performing at the 1972 Montreux Jazz Festival; on this performance they were joined by Mića Marković (saxophone) and Mladi Levi member Petar Ugrin (violin, trumpet). In the meantime, the band recorded the first Yugoslav television show in color, Put za istok, edited by Jovan Ristić and directed by Dejan Karaklajić.

During the late 1973, Korni Grupa recorded a symphonic rock English language album Not an Ordinary Life, which they released under the name The Kornelyans through the Italian record label Ricordi. The album was sold without much commercial promotion in ten thousand copies only, with the license for the album release being sold to Yugoslavia, Japan, Israel, and several South American countries. The album was produced by Carlo Alberto Rossi, a famous Italian record producer and composer, who had been working with the Italian progressive acts of the time as Premiata Forneria Marconi, Banco and Area. On the Yugoslav scene the band had an enormous success with the songs "Oj, dodole" ("Hey, Dodola"), "Ivo Lola", with the lyrics based on the last letter of Yugoslav World War II hero Ivo Lola Ribar, "Znam za kim zvono zvoni" ("I Know for Whom the Bell Tolls"), featuring as guest the singer Ditka Haberl, "Divlje jagode" ("Wild Strawberries"), "Miris" ("Scent"), with lyrics from Charles Baudelaire's sonnet "Parfum exotique", and "Praštanje" ("Forgiveness"), with lyrics by poet Brana Crnčević, who was at the time considered a dissident.

In the spring of 1974, they won first place at the festival in Opatija with the song "Moja generacija" ("My Generation") and represented Yugoslavia at the 1974 Eurovision Song Contest in Brighton, on which ABBA won the first place, with whom the band had shared the wardrobe. The single with the English-language version of "Moja generacija" and the shortened version of "Jednoj ženi" was released in Italy. During the same year the music magazine Music Week declared Korni Grupa the Yugoslav Band of the Year. However, disappointed with little success of Not an Ordinary Life and the 12th place won at the Eurovision Song Contest, Kovač decided to disband Korni Grupa. They held two farewell concerts in Studio M in Novi Sad on November 24 and a part of the concert recordings was released on the first former Yugoslav double album Mrtvo more (The Dead Sea). One record featured their singles, representing commercial and more pop-oriented side of Korni Grupa, while the other featured live recordings of "Put za Istok", "Čovek sa belom zastavom" ("The Man with a White Flag") and "Blues", representing the progressive side of their career. The band officially disbanded on December 1, 1974.

Post breakup, 1987 reunion 
After Korni Grupa disbanded Kovač started a successful career as a composer, Pejaković turned towards pop music, Boček and Hreljac became studio musicians and Furduj started a jazz career. the various artists live album Randevu s muzikom (A Rendevouz with Music), released in 1977, featured the Korni Grupa songs "I ne tako obićan život" ("Not an Ordinary Life at All") and "Jedna žena" recorded at Novi Sad farewell concerts, which were previously unreleased. During the same year, Kovač initiated the formation of a supergroup K2 (not to be confused with the 1990s duo consisting of Kovač's daughters) which ought to have featured Josip Boček, Dado Topić, Sloba Marković, Čarli Novak and Ratko Divljak, but it was never formed mostly owing to Topić's hesitating. In 1979, the recording of the musical poem 1941. was released as a posthumous studio album.

In May 1987, Korni Grupa, consisting of Kovač, Furduj, Hreljac, Boček and Dado Topić on lead vocals, reunited to perform, alongside Indexi, Time, YU Grupa, Drago Mlinarec and R.M. Točak Band, at the Legende YU Rocka (Legends of YU Rock) concert organized by Radio 101 at Zagreb's Dom Sportova. In June of the same year, the same bands performed at Belgrade's Sava Centar. The version of "Jedna žena" recorded at the Zagreb concert appeared on the various artists double live album Legende YU Rocka, released by Jugoton during the same year.

Post 1987
In 1994, the previously unreleased song "Prvo svetlo u kući broj 4" appeared on the compilation album Plima: Progresivna muzika (Tide: Progressive Music), released as a part of Komuna YU retROCKspektiva (YU RetROCKspective) album series. In 1996 the compilation album Prvo svetlo neobičnog života (The First Light of an Unordinary Life) was released, featuring a selection of tracks from Korni Grupa's progressive repertoire. During the same year, Kovač released a compilation album Moja generacija (My Generation), consisting of recordings of his songs used in the television show Zvučna viljuška (Tuning Fork), including cover versions of the Korni Grupa songs "Moja generacija" by Filip Žmaher, "Sonata" by Zoran Šandorov, "Oj, dodole" by Del Arno Band and "Jagode i maline" ("Strawberries and Raspberries") by Van Gogh.

In 2005, the three-part compilation album Ne tako običan život (Not an Ordinary Life at All) was released by PGP-RTS, featuring the collected singles, recordings from the progressive phase, the recording of "Jedna žena" from the 1987 reunion concert and the previously unreleased version of the song "Kosovka devojka" with Kovač on lead vocals.

In 2007, Dušan Prelević died in Belgrade after a long illness, aged 58. In 2015, Furduj died in Belgrade. He was 70 years old. Bojan Hreljac died in Belgrade in 2018, aged 70. Kornelije Kovač died in Belgrade in 2022, aged 81.

Legacy
The musicians which were, by their own words, influenced by Korni Grupa include Smak guitarist Radomir Mihajlović "Točak", guitarist and former Leb i Sol member Vlatko Stefanovski, guitarist and singer and former Grupa 220, Parni Valjak, Aerodrom and Azra member Jurica Pađen, singer-songwriter Đorđe Balašević, Riblja Čorba guitarist and Bajaga i Instruktori vocalist and guitarist Momčilo Bajagić "Bajaga", singer-songwriter and former Idoli member Vlada Divljan,

A number of acts have covered Korni Grupa songs: The Yugoslav jazz/funk group Ansambl Saše Subote covered the song "Ivo Lola" on their 1976 extended play Mikado, released for the Soviet market. The song was remixed in 2010 by the Serbian project Laura 2000 on their debut studio album ...pobiću se zadnji put da vidim da l' sam star (... I'll Have a One Last Fight to See if I'm Old). The Serbian actor Milorad Mandić covered the song "Trla baba lan" on his 1991 children's music album of the same name. The Serbian rock band Električni Orgazam recorded a cover version of "Magična ruka", released on their 1996 unplugged album Živo i akustično (Live and Acoustic). The soundtrack for the Radio Television of Serbia television show Zlatna viljuška (The Golden Fork) featured cover versions of Korni Grupa songs "Moja generacija" by Filip Žmaher, "Sonata" by Zoran Šandorov, "Oj, dodole" by Del Arno Band and "Jagode i maline" by Van Gogh, all featured on the Kornelije Kovač compilation album Moja generacija. The Bajaga i Instruktori keyboard player Saša Lokner recorded an instrumental version of "Put za istok", the version in itself featuring a sample of the Korni Grupa song "Zemlja", released on his 2003 solo album Evropa Elektro Express (Europe Electro Express).

The book YU 100: najbolji albumi jugoslovenske rok i pop muzike (YU 100: The Best albums of Yugoslav pop and rock music), published in 1988, features two Korni Grupa albums: Korni Grupa, polled No. 4, and 1941., polled No. 94.

The Rock Express Top 100 Yugoslav Rock Songs of All Times list, published in 2000, featured two songs by Korni Grupa: "Put za istok" (polled No.44) and "Jedna žena" (polled No.67). In 2011, the song "Etida" was polled, by the listeners of Radio 202, one of 60 greatest songs released by PGP-RTB/PGP-RTS during the sixty years of the label's existence.

The lyrics of the songs "Put za istok", "Moj bol" and "Jedna žena" were featured in Petar Janjatović's book Pesme bratstva, detinjstva & potomstva: Antologija ex YU rok poezije 1967 - 2007 (Songs of Brotherhood, Childhood & Offspring: Anthology of Ex YU Rock Poetry 1967 – 2007).

Members 
Former members
 Kornelije "Bata" Kovač – keyboards, organ, piano, vocals (1968–1974, 1987)
 Bojan Hreljac – bass guitar (1968–1974, 1987)
 Vladimir "Furda" Furduj – drums (1968–1974, 1987)
 Velibor "Borko" Kacl – guitar (1968–1969)
 Miroslava "Seka" Kojadinović – vocals (1968)
 Dušan Prelević "Prele" – vocals (1968)
 Dalibor Brun – vocals (1969)
 Dado Topić – vocals (1969–1971, 1987)
 Josip Boček – guitar (1969–1974, 1987)
 Zdravko Čolić – vocals (1971–1972)
 Zlatko Pejaković – vocals (1972–1974)

Discography

Studio albums 
 Korni Grupa (1972)
 Not an Ordinary Life (1974)
 1941. (1979)

Compilation albums 
 Korni Grupa (1971)
 Mrtvo more (1975)
 Prvo svetlo neobičnog života (1996)
 Kolekcija singlova (2001)
 Ne tako običan život (I posle trideset godina) (2005)
 The Ultimate Collection (2009)

Extended plays 
 Dzum-ram (1969)
 Zabranjeno za mlade (1971)
 TV špice (1973)

Singles 
 "Cigu-ligu" / "Čovek i pas" (1969)
 "Pastir i cvet" / "Čovek i pas" (1969)
 "Trla baba lan" / "Slika" (1970)
 "Bube" / "Neko spava pored mene" (1970)
 "Pusti da te diram" / "Jedan groš" (1971)
 "Pokloni svoj mi foto" / "Bez veze" (1972)
 "Tri palme" / "Tri čoveka u kafani" (1973)
 "Oj, dodole" / "Život" (1973)
 "Ivo Lola" / "Znam za kim zvono zvoni" (1973)
 "Etida" / "Jednoj ženi" (1973)
 "Moja generacija" / "Zbogom ostaj, o, detinjstvo" (1974)
 "Generation 42" / "One Woman" (1974)
 "Moja genereacija (My Genetartion)" / "Etude" (1974)
 "Kuda ideš, svete moj" / "Divlje jagode" (1974)
 "Miris" / "Praštanje" (1974)

Other appearances 
 "Moja generacija" (Eurovision '74; 1974)
 "I ne tako obićan život", "Jedna žena" (Randevu s muzikom; 1977)
 "Jedna žena", (Legende YU Rocka; 1987)

Video albums 
 Korni grupa (2008)

References 

 EX YU ROCK enciklopedija 1960–2006, Janjatović Petar; 
 Fatalni ringišpil: hronika beogradskog rokenrola 1959—1979, Žikić Alkesandar, publisher: Geopoetika, Belgrade, Yugoslavia, 1999

External links 
 Korni Grupa at Discogs
 Korni Grupa at Last.fm
 Korni Grupa at Rateyourmusic
 Korni Grupa at Prog Archives

Serbian rock music groups
Serbian pop rock music groups
Serbian progressive rock groups
Serbian folk rock groups
Serbian jazz-rock groups
Serbian psychedelic rock music groups
Yugoslav rock music groups
Yugoslav progressive rock groups
Yugoslav jazz-rock groups
Yugoslav psychedelic rock music groups
Eurovision Song Contest entrants for Yugoslavia
Eurovision Song Contest entrants of 1974
Musical groups from Belgrade
Musical groups established in 1968
Musical groups disestablished in 1974
1968 establishments in Yugoslavia
1974 disestablishments in Yugoslavia